John David MacRae (19 February 1876 – 20 February 1967) was a Liberal party member of the House of Commons of Canada. He was born in Apple Hill, Ontario and became a farmer.

MacRae served as councillor and reeve of Kenyon Township.

He was first elected to Parliament at the Glengarry riding in the 1935 general election. After serving one term, the 18th Canadian Parliament, MacRae campaigned under the Conservative-based National Government party banner for the 1940 election but was defeated by William MacDiarmid of the Liberals.

References

External links
 

1876 births
1967 deaths
Canadian farmers
Liberal Party of Canada MPs
Members of the House of Commons of Canada from Ontario
Conservative Party of Canada (1867–1942) candidates for the Canadian House of Commons
Mayors of places in Ontario